The Shire of Loddon is a local government area in Victoria, Australia, located in the northern part of the state.

It includes the towns of Inglewood, Boort, Serpentine, Pyramid Hill and Wedderburn. It was formed in 1995 from the amalgamation of the Shire of East Loddon, Shire of Gordon, Shire of Korong, and parts of the Rural City of Marong, Shire of Bet Bet, Shire of Maldon and Shire of Tullaroop.

The Shire is governed and administered by the Loddon Shire Council; its seat of local government and administrative centre is located at the council headquarters in Wedderburn, it also has a service centre located in Serpentine. The Shire is named after the Loddon River, a major geographical feature that meanders through the LGA.

Council

Current composition
The council is composed of five wards and five councillors, with one councillor per ward elected to represent each ward.

Administration and governance

The council meets in the council chambers at the Wedderburn Municipal Offices. It also provides customer services at both its administrative centre in Wedderburn, and its service centre in Serpentine.

Traditional owners 

The Dja Dja Wurrung and Barababaraba are the traditional owners of this land.

Townships and localities
The 2021 census, the shire had a population of 7,759 up from 7,516 in the 2016 census

^ - Territory divided with another LGA
* - Not noted in 2016 Census
# - Not noted in 2021 Census

See also
 List of places on the Victorian Heritage Register in the Shire of Loddon

References

External links
Loddon Shire Council official website
Metlink local public transport map 
Link to Land Victoria interactive maps
Loddon Shire Promotional, Events & Investment Website

Local government areas of Victoria (Australia)
Loddon Mallee (region)
 
North Central Victoria